Henri Kontinen and Christopher Rungkat were the defending champions, but did not compete in the Juniors this year.

Marin Draganja and Dino Marcan won in the final 6–3, 6–2, against Guilherme Clézar and Huang Liang-chi.

Seeds

Draw

Finals

Top half

Bottom half

External links
Draw

Boys' Doubles
2009